This is a list of political families in Lebanon and their prominent members. This list does not include historical monarchies that ruled the region of the Levant but can include its modern-ruling decedents.

Abou Fadel family 
The Abou Fadel family is a prominent Greek Orthodox family originating in the village of Ain Aanoub. They are the descendance of Prince Abd al-Masih al-Qandil, affiliated with the Yemeni princes of the Qahtani family of Ghassan.

Notable members:

 Youssef Abou Fadel – member of the first administrative council of the Mount Lebanon Mutasarrifate; brother of Habib
 Habib Abou Fadel – judge and Kaymakam
 Mounir Abou Fadel – Deputy Speaker of the Parliament; son of Habib
 Marwan Abou Fadel – Co-founder of the Lebanese Democratic Party, son of Mounir

Aoun family 

The Aoun family is a Maronite family that was recently established as political via Michel Aoun's daughters. Aoun's second child, Claudine Aoun, married politician and former brigadier general, Chamel Roukoz. The third, Chantal, is married to Gebran Bassil, whom she met at an FPM conference in Paris in 1996. He served as a minister in different cabinets, and succeeded Aoun as president of the Free Patriotic Movement in 2015. Michel's nephew, Alain Aoun, is a Member of Parliament, elected in 2009, 2018 and 2022.

Notable members:

 Joseph Aoun – political personality
 Alain Aoun – member of parliament; son of Joseph
 Michel Aoun – President, (2016-2022)
 Chamel Roukoz – politician and former brigadier general; son-in-law of Michel
 Gebran Bassil – leader of the Free Patriotic Movement; son-in-law of Michel

Arslan family 
The Arslan family is a hereditary Druze leadership dynasty descends from the Lakhmids. The family name of Arslan was given to the descendants of the dynasty. The Arslan family was sent to the coast of the Lebanon by the Muslim Khalifa in 634 and they were responsible of guarding the coast and protecting it. They ruled Beirut for 476 years (from 634 until 1110).

Notable members:

 Toufic Arslan – Greater Lebanon politician; father of Majid
 Emir Majid Arslan II – Lebanese independence hero and Druze leader; son of Toufic
 Emir Faysal Arslan – son of Emir Majid and Head of the House of Arslan from 1983 until 1989; son of Majid
 Emir Talal Arslan – son of Emir Majid, Druze leader and current Head of the House of Arslan; son of Majid
 Emir Shakib Arslan – Influential Arab politician, writer, poet and historian; brother of Adil
 Prince Adil Arslan – Ottoman politician; brother of Shakib

El Assaad family 
El-Assaad or Al As'ad is a feudal political clan originally from Najd and a main branch of the anza tribe.  Unrelated to Syrian or Palestinian Al-Assads, El-Assaad dynasty that ruled most of South Lebanon for three centuries and whose lineage defended fellow denizens of history's Jabal Amel (Mount Amel) principality – today southern Lebanon – for 36 generations, Balqa in Jordan, Nablus in Palestine, and Homs in Syria governed by Ottoman rule between generations throughout the Arab caliphate. El-Assaads are considered now "Bakaweit" (title of nobility plural of "Bek" granted to a few wealthy families in Lebanon), and are considered princes or heirs to the family's dynasty to some.

Notable members:
 Nasif Al Nassar - ruler of Jabal Amel from the Al-Saghir Dynasty.
 Ali Al Saghir - a powerful leader of Jabal Amel.
 Khalil Bek El Assaad - appointed Ottoman Governor of Nablus, Al Balqa, Marjayoun, Tyre and Homs.
 Shbib Pasha El Assaad - minister of the Ottoman Empire, army leader.
 Ali Nasrat El Assaad - advisor of the Court and a Superior in the Ministry of Foreign affairs in the Ottoman Empire.
 Kamil Bey (Esad) El-Assaad - representative of the Ottoman Empire in Beyrut.
 Ahmed El Assaad - 3rd Legislative Speaker of Lebanon.
 Kamel Bek El Assaad- 5th Legislative Speaker of Lebanon, Minister of Education, Minister of Water and Electricity, founder of Democratic Socialist Party (Lebanon).
 Ahmad Kamel El Assaad - Lebanese Option Party founder, political candidate.
 Moustafa Nassar Bek El Assaad - Supreme Court President.
 Nael El Assaad - envoy for HM King Abdullah of Jordan and former husband of late Saudi magnate Adnan Khashoggi's sister Soheir.
 Said El Assaad - former Lebanese Ambassador of Switzerland, France and Belgium and a former Member of Parliament.
 Bahija Al Solh El Assaad - wife of Said El Assaad, daughter of Prime Minister Riad Al Solh, aunt of Waleed Bin Talal.
 Nasrat El Assaad - ambassador of Lebanon to numerous countries.
 Haidar El Assaad - historian and among the first official delegates to visit the new People's Republic of China in the 1960s following Ministerial civil service – later serving as a director at the FAO of the United Nations and consultant to TRW and the World Bank.

Chamoun family 
Notable members:
 Camille Chamoun – President, 1952–58
 Dany Chamoun – Militia leader and political party leader; son of Camille
 Tracy Chamoun – Author and human rights activist; daughter of Dany
 Dory Chamoun – former party leader; son of Camille
 Camille Dory Chamoun – incumber party leader; son of Dory

Daoud family 
The Daoud family is a Druze political family from Rashaya. Politically, the family is represented by the Lanese Arab Struggle Movement which Faisal Daoud headed between 1986 and 2014.
 Salim Daoud – Former MP
 Faisal Daoud – Former party leader and MP; son of Salim
 Tarek Daoud – Current party leader and parliamentary candidate; son of Faisal

Daouk family 
The Daouk family is a prominent Sunni Beirut family that stemmed in Ras Beirut, Lebanon during the 15th century; after fleeing Marrakesh, Morocco, the family escaped Morocco in the late 12th century from Marrakesh to the Levant during the Reconquista inquisition. The immigration came as a consequence of the heavy influx of refugees from the Iberian Peninsula. This was due to the heavy influx of Arab refugees coming from the Iberian Peninsula to the Maghreb and the Levant following the fall of Al-Andalus to the Catholic Monarchs.

Notable members:

 Omar Beik Daouk
 Ahmad Daouk
 Walid Daouk

Eddé family 
Notable members:
 Émile Eddé – President during the French Mandate
 Raymond Eddé – political party leader; son of Émile
 Carlos Eddé – opposition politician; nephew of Raymond
 Michel Eddé – Minister

Eid family 
The Eid family is an Alawite political family that leads an Alawite community concentrated in the Jabal Mohsen neighborhood in Tripoli. The family founded the Arab Democratic Party which was founded in the early 70s by Ali Eid. Rifaat Eid has relations with the Syrian Alawite regime and fought during the Bab al-Tabbaneh–Jabal Mohsen conflict against Sunni armed militias who opposed the Syrian regime.

Notable members:

 Ali Eid – former General Secretary of the Arab Democratic Party; father of Rifaat
 Rifaat Eid – General Secretary of the Arab Democratic Party; son of Ali

Fatfat family 
The Fatfat family is Sunni Muslim family in the Minnieh-Dinnieh region of Northern Lebanon. Many of its members support the Future Movement and generally oppose the Syrian Government.

Notable members:

 Ahmad Fatfat – former minister of youth and sports
 Sami Fatfat – former MP; son of Ahmad

Frangieh family 
Notable members:

 Hamid Beik Frangieh – politician; brother of Suleiman
 Samir Frangieh – politician and leftist intellectual; son of Hamid
 Suleiman Frangieh – President (1970–76)
 Tony Frangieh – Cabinet Minister, Civil War militia leader; son of Suleiman
 Suleiman Frangieh, Jr. – legislator and Minister; son of Tony

Gemayel family 

The Gemayel family is a Maronite political family in the region of Metn and West Beirut which is headquartered in the town of Bikfaya. The family is mentioned in bureaucratic records as among the inhabitants of Bikfaya as early as the 16th century. Between that time until the 18th century they were the sheikhs of the village. In 1642 Sheikh Abu Aoun was the joint governor of the subdistrict of Bsharri alongside the Druze chief Zayn al-Din of the Sawwaf family. Pierre Gemayel was the founder of the Lebanese Kataeb party (Phalange) as a paramilitary youth organization inspired by Spanish Falange and Italian Fascist parties and currently has 5 seats in parliament.

Notable members:
 Pierre Gemayel – Kataeb Party founder
 Bachir Gemayel – President-elect, 1982; son of Pierre
 Nadim Gemayel – Political activist; son of Bachir
 Amine Gemayel – President, 1982–88; son of Pierre
 Pierre Amine Gemayel – legislator; son of Amine
 Sami Gemayel – Political activist; legislator; son of Amine
Geneviève Gemayel – political figure, pilot and artist; wife of Pierre I
Maurice Gemayel – served several times as minister and MP for the Metn; in-law of Pierre I

Hariri family 
Notable members:
 Rafic Hariri – 30th Prime Minister
 Saad Hariri – 33rd Prime Minister; son of Rafic Hariri
 Bahaa Hariri – Political Activist; Parliament Candidate
 Bahia Hariri – former legislator; sister of Rafic
 Ahmad Hariri – Parliamentary candidate; son of Bahia

Helou family 
Notable members:
 Charles Helou – President (1964–70)
 Nina Helou – First Lady
 Pierre Helou – Cabinet Minister;
 Henry Helou – legislator; son of Pierre

Hobeika family 
Notable members:
 Elie Hobeika – Member of Parliament and militia leader
 Gina Hobeika – Former Party leader; Wife of Elie
 Joseph Hobeika – Party leader

Jumblatt family 
The Jumblatt family is a prominent Druze family based in the Chouf area of Mount Lebanon that has dominated Druze politics since the 18th century. The current head of the family is veteran politician Walid Jumblatt, the son and successor of Kamal Jumblatt, one of the most influential figures in modern Lebanese politics. Other members of the family have contributed to cultural, economic and social life in Lebanon. Khaled Jumblatt, a distant cousin of Walid Jumblatt, held the position of minister of economy and was a prominent politician in Lebanon for many years until his death in 1993. Besides the Chouf, the family owns mansions and villas within the distinguished Clemenceau area of Beirut and in the northwest area of Sidon.

Notable members:

 Fouad Jumblatt – clan leader in the Chouf region
 Kamal Jumblatt – founder, Progressive Socialist Party, Cabinet Minister; son of Fouad
 Walid Jumblatt – Civil War militia leader; Cabinet Minister; son of Kamal
 Taymour Jumblatt – member of Parliament; son of Walid
 Aslan Jumblatt – political candidate; son of Walid
 Nazira Jumblatt – clan leader in the Chouf region; widow of Fouad
 Khaled Jumblatt – former minister of economy; distant cousin of Walid

Karam family 
Notable members:
 Youssef Bey Karam – Lebanese Maronite notable who fought in the 1860 civil war and led a rebellion in 1866–1867 against the Ottoman Empire rule in Mount Lebanon
 Youssef Salim Karam – former MP from Zgharta
 Salim Bey Karam – Current MP and former minister, son of Youssef Salim Karam

Karami family 
The Karami family is a Sunni political family in the city of Tripoli in Northern Lebanon. Members of his family traditionally held the position of mufti of Tripoli. The family is also known to adhere a strong Arab nationalist ideology as it runs the Arab Liberation Party, know known as the Dignity Movement.

Notable members:
 Abdul Hamid Karami (Prime Minister of Lebanon)
 Rashid Karami – Prime Minister older son of Abdul Hamid
 Omar Karami – Prime Minister younger son of Abdul Hamid.
 Faisal Karami – former member of Parliament; son of Omar
Mustafa Karami – founder of the National Youth Party
Ahmad Karami – former Minister of State; son Mustafa

El Khazen family 

The El Khazen family were very influential within the Maronite Church. Several members have played leading roles in politics for many generations. In modern times, Khazen have always represented Keserwan with at least one MP in the Lebanese Parliament. They have also been represented in many recent governments. Prominent politicians include Cheikh Philippe El Khazen, a prominent doctor and medical professor born in 1921 in Ghosta. Cheikh Philippe El Khazen was a member of the Parliament in 1968-1972 and a Co-Founder and Vice President of the Maronite League and Farid Haykal Khazen, incumbent MP.

Notable members:
 Wadih Nemr El Khazen – Lebanese Minister
 Wadih Nemr El Khazen – President of the Central Maronite Council
 Farid Elias El Khazen – Lebanese Member of Parliament
 Farid Haikal El Khazen – Lebanese Minister
Philippe El Khazen – associate professor of medicine and politician
 Joseph Dergham El Khazen – Maronite Patriarch
 Joseph Ragi El Khazen – Maronite Patriarch
 Tobias El Khazen – Maronite Patriarch

Lahoud family 
The Lahoud family is a Maronite family whose members claim to have been the decedents and were a part of the Dhaou families of the Levant, they allegedly trace their origin back to Ghassanids. In modern politics, the family saw the likes of Emile Lahoud as the country's president who had close ties with the Syrian Al-Assad regime.

Notable members:

 Jamil Lahoud (1901–1983), general in the Lebanese Army and former minister and MP, father of president Emile Lahoud
 Émile Lahoud (b. 1936), president of Lebanon from 1998 to 2007
 Emile Lahoud Jr. (b. 1975), Lebanese politician, son of president Emile Lahoud
Nasri Lahoud – Head of the High Legal Magistrate, Military Judge (son of Jamil).
 , (1912–1987), Lebanese Army officer and MP of Metn district between 1972 until his death, brother of Salim Lahoud
 Salim Lahoud (1910–1971), former Minister and MP of Metn District, brother of Fouad Lahoud
 Nassib Lahoud (1944–2012), Lebanese politician, son of Salim

Mghabghab family 
The Mghabghab family is a Greek Catholic political family in the Chouf region. The family is known to be allied with the National Liberal Party and having members that are viewed as independence heroes.
 Naim Mghabghab – political leader and independence hero
 Ghassan Mghabghab – political leader; son of Naim
 Joseph Mghabghab – lawyer and politician

Mikati family 
Notable members:
 Taha Mikati – Businessman; brother of Najib
 Azmi Mikati – Businessman; son of Taha
 Najib Mikati – Prime minister of Lebanon; brother of Taha

Moawad family 
The Moawad family is one of numerous Maronite Christian political families ruling in the region of Zgharta-Ehden. Rene Moawad was the 9th president of the republic and his widow, Nayla, founded the René Moawad Foundation, to further the goals of dialogue, peace, and social justice, to which they had dedicated their life. Nayla Moawad was elected to the National Assembly in 1991 and was a member of the Qornet Shawan Gathering. The eldest son of Rene, Michel Moawad, founded the Independence Movement, a reformist, Lebanese Nationalist party that goes against the Syrian Regime and the weapons of Hezbollah.

Notable members:

 Anis Moawad – regional politician
 René Moawad – President (1989); son of Anis
 Michel Moawad – Parliament member; son of Rene
 Nayla Moawad – legislator; widow of René

Murr family 
The Murr family is a Greek Orthodox family from the district of Metn who are notable for launching the Murr TV (MTV). Many of its members have held ministerial and parliamentary positions, most notably Michel El-Murr and his son Elias who made fortunes in Africa. The family is married into the Tueni family.

Notable members:

 Michel Murr; former member of parliament and deputy prime minister
 Elias Murr; former Deputy Prime Minister and Minister of the Interior and Municipalities; son of Michel
 Michel Murr; member of parliament; son of Elias
 Mirna Murr; head of the Federation of Municipalities of the Metn
 Gabriel Murr; politician and businessman who launched MTV in 1991; brother of Michel
 Michel Gabriel Murr; businessman and CEO of Murr TV (MTV); son of Gabriel
 May Murr; political activist and professor; sister of Michel and Gabriel
 Lina Murr Nehmé; author and professor; daughter of May

Al-Musawi 
The Al-Musawi is a Shi'ite political family. Members of this family are referred to by the anglicised version of their name. They are usually given the honorific title Sayyid before their first name, implying that a person is a direct descendant of the Islamic prophet Muhammad through his sixth generation grandson, Musa al-Kadhim.

Notable members:

 Abbas al-Musawi - (1952 - 16 February 1992) was an influential Muslim Scholar.
 Husayn Al-Musawi - is Lebanese who founded the now-dissolved Islamist militia Islamic Amal in 1982.
 Ibrahim Mousawi - is a Lebanese journalist and media relations officer.

Osseiran family 
The Osseiran family traces its Shia origins to what is now Iraq and there to the tribe of the Bani Asad, which fought alongside Hussein - the son of Ali and grandson of the prophet Mohammed, at Karbala in 680. After their defeat the survivors suffered persecution and after an unknown period of time one of the tribal members - Haidar - reportedly fled to Baalbek, where he had two sons: Ali and Osseiran. According to the family's historiography, the latter settled in Sidon/Saida. Historians have established that the Osseirans rose to prominence and power as grain merchants in Sidon and the Jabal Amel region of modern-day Southern Lebanon soon after the Ottoman Empire assumed control over the area in 1516.

Notable members:

 Adel Osseiran – statesman, a former Speaker of the Lebanese Parliament
 Ali Osseiran – MP and former government minister; son of Adel
 Hassan Osseiran – Feudal owner
 Sheikh Mohamad Osseiran – mufti of Saida and Zahrani districts of South Lebanon; son of Hassan

Pakradouni family 
Notable members:

 Karim Pakradouni – former Kataeb leader 
 Jihad Pakradouni – current MP; son of Karim

Saad family 
The Saad family is a Sunni Muslim political family in the city of Sidon. The family is known to have founded the Popular Nasserite Organization which is currently led by the founder's son and MP, Osama Saad.

Notable members:

 Maarouf Saad – Lebanese politician and activist and founder of the Popular Nasserite Organization
 Mustafa Saad – Lebanese politician and former secretary-general of the Popular Nasserite Organization; son of Maarouf
 Osama Saad – Lebanese politician and secretary-general of the Popular Nasserite Organization; son of Maarouf

Salam family 
Notable members:
 Salim Ali Salam – held many local offices in Beirut
 Anbara Salam Khalidi – feminist activist; daughter of Salim
 Saeb Salam – 8th Prime Minister of Lebanon; son of Salim
 Tammam Salam – 49th Prime Minister of Lebanon and acting president of Lebanon; son of Seab

Skaff family 
The Skaff family is a Greek Catholic political family in the city of Zahle. The family is represented politically by the political party and an electoral coalition the Popular Bloc which is led by Myriam Skaff, the widow of Elias Skaff.

Notable members:
 Joseph Skaff – held several ministerial positions
 Elias Skaff – Parliament member; son of Joseph
 Myriam Skaff – party leader; widow of Elias

Al Solh family 
Notable members:
 Sami al Solh – 3rd Prime Minister
 Adel Al Solh – Politician; Cousin of Sami al Solh
 Riad Al Solh – 1st Prime Minister; Grandfather of Al Waleed bin Talal Al Saud
 Leila Al Solh – Minister of Industry; Daughter of Riad al Solh
 Bahija Al Solh El Assaad - wife of Said El Assaad, daughter of Riad Al Solh, aunt of Waleed Bin Talal.
 Takieddine Solh – 15th Prime Minister; Brother of Kazem Solh
 Kazem Al Solh – Diplomat; Member of Parliament
 Raghid El-Solh – author and researcher; son of Kazem
 Kamel Ahmad Basha el Solh – High judge in the Ottoman Imperial Court
 Afif al Solh – Parliament member of Syria
 Rachid Al Solh – 16th Prime Minister of Lebanon
 Waheed Al Solh – Activist; Politician; First cousin and husband of Mounira Al solh
 Mounira Al Solh – Political Activist; Parliament Candidate; First cousin and wife of Waheed Al solh
 Sana Al Solh – Political Activist

Sursock family 

The Sursock family is a Greek Orthodox family and used to be one of the most important families of Beirut. Having originated in the Greek-Orthodox village of Barbara near Jubail, the family has lived in Beirut since 1712, when their forefather Jabbour Aoun (who later adopted the family name Sursock) left the village of Barbara. After the turn of the 19th century, they began to establish significant positions of power within the Ottoman Empire. The family, through lucrative business ventures, savvy political maneuvering, and strategic marriages, embarked on what Leila Fawaz called "the most spectacular social climb of the nineteenth century," and, at their peak, had built a close network of relations to the families of Egyptian, French, Irish, Russian, Italian and German aristocracies, alongside a manufacturing and distribution empire spanning the Mediterranean.

Tawk family 
Notable members:

 Gebran Tawk – Local leader; father of Myriam
 Myriam Tawk – party leader; daughter of Gebran, married into the Skaff family
 William Tawk – MP; son of Gebran
 Sethrida Tawk – MP and former Chairwomen of the Lebanese Forces; cousin of Myriam

Tueni family 
The Tueni family is a prominent Greek Orthodox family. It is one of the original aristocratic “Seven Families” of Beirut, along with the Bustros, Fayad, Araman, Sursock, Ferneini, and Trad families, who constituted the traditional high society of Beirut for a long time. The family is known for being the founders of Al-Nahar newspaper and for being critics of the Syrian government which costed the life of a March 14 member and Lebanese nationalist, Gebran Tueni.

Notable members:

 Gebran Tueni (journalist) – Lebanese journalist, founder of the newspapers Al Ahrar and An-Nahar
 Ghassan Tueni – Lebanese journalist, ambassador, politician, government minister, Member of Parliament; son of Gebran I
 Gebran Tueni – Lebanese journalist, politician, Member of Parliament, assassinated; son of Ghassan
 Nayla Tueni – politician and former MP; daughter of Gebran Tueni
 Nadia Tueni – Lebanese Francophone poet; wife of Ghassan Tueni

El Zein family 

Notable members:

 Youssef El-Zein – land owner
 Abdul Latif El-Zein – politician and former member of the Lebanese Parliament; son of Youssef
 Abdul Majeed El-Zein – politician and a retired officer; son of Youssef
 Abdul Karim Youssef El-Zein – soldier and politician; son of Youssef

See also 

 List of political families
 Za'im system

References 

Lebanese families
Politics of Lebanon
Lebanon politics-related lists